Chamber of Representatives of Burkina Faso was the upper house of the bicameral legislature of Burkina Faso from 1991 to 2002.

The upper chamber was established in June 1991 by the constitution. It had 132 members. The members were elected with indirect elections from provincial councils, religious communities, trade unions, universities, NGOs, and other interest groups. Four members were appointed by the President of Burkina Faso.
The chamber had advisory role on legislation. The upper chamber was abolished in January 2002.

Presidents

See also
Politics of Burkina Faso
List of legislatures by country

References

Government of Burkina Faso
Politics of Burkina Faso
Defunct national legislatures
Burkina Faso
1991 establishments in Burkina Faso
2002 disestablishments in Burkina Faso